Macrodiaporthe is a genus of fungi within the Melanconidaceae family. This is a monotypic genus, containing the single species Macrodiaporthe occulta.

References

External links
Macrodiaporthe at Index Fungorum

Melanconidaceae
Monotypic Sordariomycetes genera